During the 2009–10 Belgian football season, Standard Liège competed in the Belgian Pro League.

Season summary
Having won the title the past two seasons running, Liège were looking to make it a hat-trick of title, but very quickly fell off the title pace. Manager László Bölöni resigned in February with the club 19 points adrift of leaders Anderlecht. He was replaced by Dominique D'Onofrio, brother of club vice-president Lucien and Liège's former technical director between 2002 and 2006. However, form failed to improve and the club finished in eighth, two points adrift of the title play-offs - as a result, failing to qualify for European competition.

Kit
Liège's kits were sponsored by Belgian telecommunications company BASE.

First-team squad
Squad at end of season

Left club during season

Results

Belgian Cup

Sixth round

Seventh round

UEFA Champions League

Group stage

UEFA Europa League

Round of 32

Round of 16

Quarter-finals

Hamburg won 5–2 on aggregate.

References

Standard Liège seasons
Belgian football clubs 2009–10 season